Stephen McAdoo (born November 6, 1970) is an American professional football coach and former player who is the offensive coordinator for the Edmonton Elks of the Canadian Football League (CFL). He played professionally as an offensive lineman for parts of three seasons for Cleveland Browns of the National Football League (NFL) and the Shreveport Pirates of the CFL.

Recent coaching career
On February 6, 2020, it was announced that McAdoo had joined the Toronto Argonauts as the team's offensive line coach. The 2020 CFL season was cancelled, but he coached for the Argonauts in 2021 where the team finished in first place in the East Division.

On January 4, 2022, McAdoo formally joined the Edmonton Elks as the team's offensive coordinator.

References

External links
 Saskatchewan Roughriders profile

1970 births
Living people
American football offensive linemen
Canadian football offensive linemen
American players of Canadian football
People from Murfreesboro, Tennessee
Cleveland Browns players
Shreveport Pirates players
Tennessee Tech Golden Eagles football coaches
Montreal Alouettes coaches
Toronto Argonauts coaches
Edmonton Elks coaches
Saskatchewan Roughriders coaches